Lempira is one of the 18 departments in Honduras. located in the western part of the country, it is bordered by the departments of Ocotepeque and Copán to the west, Intibucá to the east, and Santa Bárbara to the north. To its south lies the El Salvador–Honduras border. The departmental capital is Gracias.

It was named Gracias department until 1943. In colonial times, Gracias was an early important administrative center for the Spaniards. It eventually lost importance to Antigua, in Guatemala.

Lempira is a rugged department, and it is relatively isolated from the rest of the country. The highest mountain peak in Honduras, Cerro las Minas, is in Lempira. The department was named after Lempira, a local chieftain of the Lenca people who fought against the Spanish conquistadores in the early 16th century. Opals are mined near the town of Erandique.

The department covers a total surface area of 4,290 km². In 2005, had an estimated population of 277,910.

Municipalities

 Belén
 Candelaria
 Cololaca
 Erandique
 Gracias
 Gualcince
 Guarita
 La Campa
 La Iguala
 Las Flores
 La Unión
 La Virtud
 Lepaera
 Mapulaca
 Piraera
 San Andrés
 San Francisco
 San Juan Guarita
 San Manuel Colohete
 San Marcos de Caiquín
 San Rafael
 San Sebastián
 Santa Cruz
 Talgua
 Tambla
 Tomalá
 Valladolid
 Virginia

Notes

References

 
Departments of Honduras